Melody Jean Miller (February 19, 1945 – November 8, 2022) was an aide to the Kennedy family from the time she was a college intern for Jacqueline Kennedy Onassis.

Biography
Miller was born in Seattle on February 19, 1945. She grew up in Arlington, Virginia, graduated from Yorktown High School (Arlington County, Virginia) and attended Pennsylvania State University, studying education and political science. 
 
Miller married Paul McElligott and James Rogers before marrying William P. Wilson who worked for JFK and died in 2014. Wilson “negotiated the terms of Kennedy’s historic first televised debate with Richard M. Nixon in 1960.”

Miller was found dead from a heart attack in her home in Washington, D.C., on November 8, 2022. She was 77.

Career
In 1968, she was the last person to turn out the lights in Robert F. Kennedy’s Senate office after he was assassinated. Miller went to work for him after she graduated from Penn State. She then spent thirty seven years working for Ted Kennedy as a legislative and press aide and then deputy press secretary.

Some of the jobs she did was help Jackie Kennedy handle the condolences sent after John F. Kennedy’s death and Rose Kennedy’s 100th birthday celebration.

References

1945 births
2022 deaths
Pennsylvania State University alumni
People from Arlington County, Virginia
Press secretaries
Yorktown High School (Virginia) alumni